General elections were held in South Africa on 30 November 1977. The National Party, led by John Vorster won a landslide victory in the House of Assembly. The newly formed Progressive Federal Party, led by Colin Eglin became the official opposition. The New Republic Party, successor to the United Party, won only 10 seats, all but one of them in Natal Province. Once again, the Herstigte Nasionale Party failed to win any seats.

In the 1977 elections, the National Party received its best-ever result with support of 65% of the vote and (after a by-election) 135 seats in parliament out of 165. Vorster, however resigned as Prime Minister for alleged health reasons on 28 September 1978.

Background
On 11 February 1975 four liberal MPs led by Harry Schwarz broke away from the United Party and created the Reform Party. The party merged with the Progressive Party on 25 July 1975 to form the Progressive Reform Party. In 1977 another group of United Party members left the party to form the Committee for a United Opposition, which then joined the Progressive Reform Party to form the Progressive Federal Party. This proved to realign the opposition in Parliament, as the PFP became the official opposition party.

Results
Due to the death of the National Party candidate in the Springs constituency, one seat was left vacant until a by-election was held, which was won by the NP.

References

General elections in South Africa
South Africa
General
Events associated with apartheid
South African general election
Election and referendum articles with incomplete results